Sherkat Chah (also Romanized as Sherkat Chāh) is a village in Margan Rural District, in the Central District of Hirmand County, Sistan and Baluchestan Province, Iran. At the 2006 census, its population was 153, in 27 families.

References 

Populated places in Hirmand County